The Murray, later MacGregor of MacGregor Baronetcy, of Lanrick in the County of Perth, is a title in the Baronetage of Great Britain. It was created on 3 July 1795 for John Murray. He was a member of the Scottish MacGregor clan. This branch of the family had been forbidden to wear their own surname by King James VI, the only instance of this in British history. The ban was revoked in 1661 by King Charles II but restored during the reign of William and Mary. It was finally repealed in 1774. However, it was not until 1822 that the family obtained Royal licence to use the family surname. The second Baronet was a colonial administrator and served as Governor of Dominica, Antigua, Barbados and Trinidad. Sir Evan MacGregor, third son of the second Baronet, was Permanent Secretary to the Admiralty. The sixth Baronet was a Brigadier in the Scots Guards. The MacGregors of MacGregor are also the Chiefs of Clan Gregor.

Murray, later MacGregor of MacGregor baronets, of Lanrick (1795)
Lieutenant-Colonel Sir John Murray, 1st Baronet (1745–1822), later Macgregor Murray.
Major-General Sir Evan John Murray-MacGregor, 2nd Baronet (1785–1841), married (28 May 1808), Lady Elizabeth Murray (d. 1846), daughter of John Murray, 4th Duke of Atholl).
Sir John Atholl Bannatyne Murray-MacGregor, 3rd Baronet (1810–1851), of Lanrick and Balquhidder.
Rear-Admiral Sir Malcolm Murray-MacGregor, 4th Baronet (1834–1879)
Captain Sir Malcolm MacGregor, 5th Baronet (1873–1958)
Brigadier Sir Gregor MacGregor, 6th Baronet (1925–2003)
Sir Malcolm Gregor Charles MacGregor, 7th Baronet (b. 1959)

The heir presumptive is his only brother, Ninian Hubert Alexander MacGregor (b. 1961)
The heir presumptive's heir apparent is his only son, Archibald Callum Ludovic MacGregor (b. 2000)

Notes

References
Kidd, Charles, Williamson, David (editors). Debrett's Peerage and Baronetage (1990 edition). New York: St Martin's Press, 1990, 

Baronetcies in the Baronetage of Great Britain
1795 establishments in Great Britain